For Freedom and Truth was the last proclamation of the Hungarian National Government written on 4 November 1956 in Budapest, Hungary, during the Hungarian Revolution of 1956, by Minister of State István Bibó in the parliament building as the author, and the only person and representative of the government remaining in the parliament, awaited arrest by Soviet military forces.

History

The Soviet army attacked the dawn of 4 November 1956 and Imre Nagy visited the Soviet embassy for negotiations but did not return.  In the morning Zoltán Tildy together with István Szabó and István Bibó held a meeting in the parliament, but when the Soviet troops reached and surrounded the building Zoltán Tildy went to negotiate with them and reached an agreement: the Soviets could occupy the building after all civilians left safely and Zoltán  Tildy would leave as well.

The proclamation's author, István Bibó, was the only cabinet minister who remained at his post in the parliament building and thus considered himself the only representative of the Hungarian government at the time.

The proclamation

The proclamation claimed that the Hungarian government did not seek to pursue an anti-Soviet policy, and denounced accusations that the revolution was orchestrated by fascists.  It proposed that the Hungarian government would have been able to limit mob rule and said that the intervention of a foreign army was the major cause of tensions.

István Bibó called the Hungarians to not recognise the Soviet military or the Soviet puppet government as legal authority, and to resist them with passive civil disobedience, but not a civil war.  The author had been in the government for only one day and claimed that the reason he did not call for armed resistance was that he was not aware of the military situation.

The author called the world great powers and the United Nations to protect the freedom of the Hungarian nation in accordance with the United Nations Charter.

The proclamation declared Minister of State Anna Kéthly to be the only authorised representative of the Hungarian government abroad.

References

Hungarian Revolution of 1956
1956 documents